The Central Methodist Episcopal Church (now the Central United Methodist Church) is a historic church located at 215 North Capitol Avenue in Lansing, Michigan. It was listed on the National Register of Historic Places in 1980.

History
The first meeting of Methodists in the Lansing area occurred in 1845. In 1861, Central Methodist Episcopal Church was officially organized, and the congregation purchased a lot on the corner of what is now Ottawa and Washington to construct a church. The building was completed in 1863, but was quickly outgrown by the increasing congregation. In 1882, the church bought a lot for a new church, located on the present church site. A number of architects were considered, and Elijah E. Myers, the architect of the Michigan State Capitol, was finally chosen. H.W. Coddington of Kalamazoo, Michigan was chosen as the building, and construction commenced in 1889. Construction was completed in 1890.

A temple house, designed by Lee Black, was added in 1922-23.

Description
The Central Methodist Episcopal Church is a low, massive, Richardsonian Romanesque structure built from dark red Ionia sandstone. The church measures one hundred fifty feet long by eighty-six feet wide. The main elevation is a broad facade with an eighty-five-foot high square tower located at one corner and a shorter half-round tower located at the other. Inside the church is a broad, open lobby with two U-shaped staircases leading to a second-floor lobby. A broad entryway leads to the sanctuary, which is a wide, low room containing a rear gallery and pews set in concentric rows around a low pulpit. The ceiling is supported by open timber trusses. All the trim is of red oak.

Also on the property is a Temple House, which is a utilitarian, three-story, brick structure faced with stonework which echoing that of the church. The Temple House contains the church offices, a two-story auditorium, Sunday school classrooms, and a gymnasium.

References

External links
 Lansing Central United Methodist Church

Methodist churches in Michigan
Churches on the National Register of Historic Places in Michigan
Romanesque Revival church buildings in Michigan
Churches completed in 1890
Churches in Lansing, Michigan
National Register of Historic Places in Lansing, Michigan
Michigan State Historic Sites in Ingham County